The Mayor of Rangpur City is the chief executive of the Rangpur City Corporation in Bangladesh. The Mayor's office administers all city services, public property, most public agencies, and enforces all city and state laws within Rangpur City.

The Mayor's office is located in Nagar Bhaban; it has jurisdiction over all 33 wards of Rangpur City.

List of officeholders 
Political parties

Election

Election Result 2022

References

Mayors of places in Bangladesh